"Best I Ever Had (Grey Sky Morning)" is a song recorded by American alternative rock band Vertical Horizon on their fourth album Everything You Want, which was released in 1999.  It was released as a single in 2001. It served as the band's fourth overall single, and their third consecutive Top Ten hit on the Billboard Adult Top 40 charts.

Charts

Release history

Gary Allan version

In 2005, country music singer Gary Allan covered the song for his 2005 album Tough All Over. His version, entitled "Best I Ever Had" was released as the album's first single and became his eighth top-10 hit on the US Billboard Hot Country Songs charts, with a peak at  7 in late 2005.

Music video
The video was directed by Paul Boyd and filmed at the Salton Sea.

Chart performance
"Best I Ever Had" debuted at No. 56 on the US Billboard Hot Country Songs for the week of June 11, 2005. It quickly became Allan's best-selling single and remained as such until 2012.

Weekly charts

Year-end charts

Certifications

References

Vertical Horizon songs
Gary Allan songs
1999 songs
2001 singles
2005 singles
RCA Records singles
MCA Nashville Records singles
Song recordings produced by Mark Wright (record producer)
Songs written by Matt Scannell